Line I is a planned addition to the Buenos Aires Underground.

Line I will run from  Parque Chacabuco ("Directorio") to Ciudad Universitaria with 18 new stations. The route length would be 12.6 km. The future of this line (which had the lowest priority in the expansion plans) is currently uncertain since it has been proposed that a Metrobus line be built instead, which would follow the same route as the proposed metro rail line.

The first phase would have a route that went from Parque Chacabuco to Plaza Italia ("Serrano"), a length of 6.6 km, and the line would have 10 stations.

Phase 1
 Serrano - Directorio line is planned as follows:

 Serrano  
 Costa Rica
 Córdoba
 Corrientes 
 Warnes
 Díaz Vélez
 Aranguen
 Rivadavia 
 Pedro Goyena
 Directorio

Phase 2
 Palermo (interchange to Line D)
 Chenaut
 Jorge Newbery
 Teodoro García
 Virrey del Pino
 Barrancas de Belgrano

References

External links 
 Subterráneos de Buenos Aires (Official Page) New Lines
 Buenos Aires Ciudad (Official Government Page) Nuevas Líneas: F, G and I  (Spanish)
 Actual system map

Buenos Aires Underground
Buenos Aires - Line I